Mirdamad Metro Station is a station in Tehran Metro Line 1, located next to Mirdamad Boulevard. It was opened on 19 May 2009. The station has an outdoor parking facility for commuters.

Facilities
The station has a ticket office, escalators, cash machines, bus routes, pay phones, water fountains, and a lost and found.

References

Tehran Metro stations
Railway stations opened in 2009